Treshchevka is a rural locality (a selo) in Chistopolyanskoye Rural Settlement, Ramonsky District, Voronezh Oblast, Russia. The population was 77 as of 2010. There are 3 streets.

Geography 
Treshchevka is located 41 km west of Ramon (the district's administrative centre) by road. Medvezhye is the nearest rural locality.

References 

Rural localities in Ramonsky District